Romeo James (born 15 September 1958) is an Indian field hockey player. He competed at the 1982 Delhi Asian Games, winning a silver medal with the Indian team. He competed at the 1984 Summer Olympics in Los Angeles, where the Indian team placed fifth.

Career

As player
He competed at the 1982 Delhi Asian Games, winning a silver medal with the Indian team. He competed at the 1984 Summer Olympics in Los Angeles, where the Indian team placed fifth.

Under his captaincy, the Services Team has won the National Hockey Championship in 1982 & 1985.

As coach
He was the coach of Indian Hockey team at the 2010 Men's FIH Hockey World Cup. He was the coach when Indian team won the silver medal at the 1994 Asian Games and Indira Gandhi International Gold Cup in 1994.

References

External links

1958 births
Living people
Olympic field hockey players of India
Indian male field hockey players
Field hockey players at the 1984 Summer Olympics
Recipients of the Dhyan Chand Award
Asian Games medalists in field hockey
Field hockey players at the 1982 Asian Games
Asian Games silver medalists for India
Medalists at the 1982 Asian Games